La Dépèche de Tahiti (The Tahiti Dispatch) was a daily, French-language newspaper published in French Polynesia. The newspaper, which was founded in 1964, was headquartered in Tahiti.

The newspaper was liquidated in October 2020.

References

External links
La Dépèche de Tahiti

Newspapers published in French Polynesia
Publications established in 1964